Alexander Megos (born 12 August 1993) is a German rock climber. He was the first climber to on-sight (climb on the first try without prior practice or advice) a route graded . He has completed multiple routes and boulder problems that are notoriously difficult, including two  routes (Perfecto Mundo and Bibliographie), six  routes (First Round, First Minute, Fight Club, King Capella, Ratstaman Vibrations, and The Full Journey), and some boulders with a confirmed  rating.

Climbing career 
Megos started climbing at the age of six. With his father, he climbed multi-pitch routes up to 300 m at the age of ten. In 2006, Megos began training in the mountainous region of his native Bavaria, known as Franconian Switzerland, and later at the German Alpine Club's national climbing center in Erlangen-Nuremberg. There, he was mentored by Patrick Matros and Ludwig Korb, who continue to train and coach Megos to this day. In 2007, Megos completed his first . Two years later, in 2009, he climbed his first  by completing Drive-by Shooting, and, in 2011, his first  by ascending San Ku Kai.

Since 2006, Alexander Megos has been climbing competitively. He won two youth European Championship titles (2009 and 2010) and was the runner-up in the youth World Champion in 2011. In 2009, he won every single competition in the EYC series. In 2017, he was the runner-up in bouldering at the European Championship and won his first World Cup in the lead climbing discipline in Briançon, France, on 21 July 2018.

After graduating from high school in 2012, he has dedicated himself to climbing. On 24 March 2013, he ascended Estado Critico in Siurana, Spain, completing the world's first 9a on-sight. In August 2013, Megos climbed The Red Project 9a (35), Australia's first 9a, and Wheelchair (9a+). Due to the boulder's uncommonly long length, Megos assigned the Wheelchair a sport grading.

Alexander Megos is known for speedily ascending difficult climbing routes. He also managed a redpoint attempt of the famous Action Directe within two hours, setting a record time. In addition, he is the only person to complete one-day tours of Biography and Realization  in Ceüse, France.

In June 2014, Alexander Megos, together with Roger Schäli, completed the first ascent of the 20-pitch route Fly  in Staldeflue, Switzerland, one of the most difficult big-wall climbing routes in the world.

In April 2015, Megos returned to Australia, completing the first ascent of SchweinebaumeIn 9a (35). On 1 October 2015, he climbed the route Supernova in Franconian Switzerland and, by doing so, likely established the first route of grade 11+ (UIAA) (9a + / 9b French) in German-speaking countries.

Megos' ascent of First Round First Minute in December 2015 marked the completion of his first .

On 9 May 2018, he secured the first ascent of the route Perfecto Mundo in Margalef, Spain, a line bolted by Chris Sharma. Megos and Sharma had tried it together several times in the days before his ascent and graded it .

In 2017, he won the silver medal for bouldering at both the European Championships in Munich and the IFSC Lead World Cup in Kranj, Slovenia. In 2018, he won a bronze medal in the lead climbing discipline at the IFSC World Cup in Chamonix, France, and, one week later, won the gold medal at the Briancon World Cup. Later in that year, he took the bronze medal at the World Championships in the lead competition. He followed this up with a silver in lead at the 2019 World Championships. By reaching the finals of the combined event at the World Championships, he secured a qualifying spot for Tokyo's 2020 Summer Olympics.

Megos has also climbed in the La Sportiva Legends competitions, where he has placed second and third on numerous occasions, celebrating in a win in 2018. He currently holds the high point of Black Diamond's The Project, which is widely considered one of the world's hardest indoor routes.

In May 2020, Megos ascended Upgrade U 8C, one of the most challenging boulder problems in his native northern Bavaria.

In August 2020, Megos completed his long-term project Bibliographie in Céüse, grading it , after working on it for 60 days.

Notable ascents

Redpointed routes 

 Bibliographie (5 August 2020). First Ascent (after 60 days of effort). Route bolted by Ethan Pringle.
 Perfecto Mundo (9 May 2018). First Ascent. Route bolted by Chris Sharma.

 First Round, First Minute (31 December 2015). Third Ascent. First Ascent by Chris Sharma.
 Fight Club (14 August 2016). First Ascent. Route bolted by Sonnie Trotter.
 Mejorando Imagen (25 April 2021). Second Ascent. First Ascent by Ramón Julián. Originally graded 9a, upgraded by Megos to 9b. 
 King Capella (November 2021). Second Ascent (after 9 days of effort). First Ascent by Will Bosi.
 Ratstaman Vibrations (31 July 2022). First Ascent. Route bolted by Chris Sharma.
 The Full Journey (9 October 2022). First Ascent. Route bolted by Tom Bolger. 

9a+/b (5.15a/b)
 Chan Chan Bastards
 Supernova - First Ascent.
 La Capella

 Demencia Senil - First Ascent by Chris Sharma.
 La Rambla - Megos climbed it on his second try.
 Biographie - First Ascent by Chris Sharma. Megos climbed it in one day, on his third try.
 Corona - Third Ascent.
 Classified - First Ascent. 
 Modified - First Ascent.
 First Ley - Megos also sent a variation called La Ley Indignata 9a (5.14d), possible first ascent.
 Thor's Hammer - First Repeat. First Ascent by Adam Ondra.
 Geocache - First Ascent. Repeated by Adam Ondra.
 Becoming - First Ascent.
 Super Crackinette - First Ascent.
 Jaws 2 - Sent on third try.

Action Directe - Megos sent this route in just two hours. Action Directe was the world's first 9a, and continues to be a benchmark for the grade.
 La Sensación del Bloque - March 2017 - FA of the first South American 9a in Valle de los Condores, Chile.
Dreamcatcher - Fourth Ascent. Climbed in one day, other previous ascents by Chris Sharma, Sean McColl and Ben Harnden took multiple days.
Era Vella - Second Try. Subject to much controversy about whether it is 9a(14d) or 8c+(14c).
 Speed Intégrale - Voralpsee, Switzerland in two days, 2017 
 Coup de grâce - Val Bavona, Switzerland second go, 2017 

Other notable ascents

Pure Imagination: 8c+ (5.14c). Flash.
 Fly: 8c (5.14b). Megos made the first free ascent of this twenty pitch big wall in Switzerland.
Hubble: 8c+ (5.14c) - Megos became the first to climb both Action Directe and Hubble by sending Hubble in June 2016.

Onsighted routes 

 Estado Critico - World's first 9a onsight.
 TCT

 Victimes del Passat

Boulder problems 

 Wheelchair - First Ascent. Although Megos suggested a 9a+ sport climbing grade because of its length, this Wheel of Life variation is not a sport climb. It is a long boulder problem, harder than Wheel of Life, and possibly worth a 8C+ (V16) rating.

 Story of Two Worlds - First Ascended by Dave Graham in 2005, repeated by Megos in December 2020.
 Dreamtime - Ascended by Megos on 18 December 2020.
Upgrade U - First Ascent May 2020, rated 8C and accepted as the hardest boulder problem in the Frankenjura.
Half Life - Second ascent April 2020, Frankenjura, Megos confirmed as 8C
The Finnish Line - Summer 2017 - Second ascent of hard testpiece established by Nalle Hukkataival in Rocklands, South Africa.
 Wheel of Life: - First Ascent by Dai Koyamada. Megos suggested a sport climbing grade of 9a (5.14d), but this is not a sport climb. It is a long boulder problem, rated 8C.
 Lucid Dreaming - Third Ascent of Paul Robinson's boulder, originally graded 8C+ (V16).

 Never Ending Story
 Bad Boys for Life - First Ascent.
 Montecore:
 Riot Act
 Double Demerit - First Repeat.
 Sky
 Trainspotting - First Ascent.

Rankings

Climbing World Cup

Climbing World Championships 
Youth

Adult

Climbing European Championships

Number of medals in the Climbing World Cup

Lead

See also 
List of grade milestones in rock climbing
History of rock climbing
Rankings of most career IFSC gold medals

References

External links

 

 
 
 
 

1993 births
Living people
German rock climbers
Sport climbers at the 2020 Summer Olympics
Olympic sport climbers of Germany
Sportspeople from Erlangen
IFSC Climbing World Championships medalists